Student loans and grants in the United Kingdom are primarily provided by the government through the Student Loans Company (SLC), an executive non-departmental public body. The SLC is responsible for Student Finance England and Student Finance Wales, and is a delivery partner of Student Finance NI and the Student Awards Agency for Scotland. Most undergraduate university students resident in the United Kingdom are eligible for student loans, and some students on teacher training courses may also apply for loans. Student loans also became available from the 2016/17 academic year to postgraduate students who study a taught Masters, research or Doctoral course.

History

Education Act 1962
In the years following World War II, most local education authorities (LEAs) paid students' tuition fees and also provided a maintenance grant to help with living costs; this did not have to be repaid. The Education Act 1962 made it a legal obligation for all LEAs to give full-time university students a maintenance grant. By the early 1980s the maintenance grant depended on parental income and for many students, about 30,000, was a minimum grant. There was no legal obligation on parents to make this up to the full grant. The full grant had increased by 1980 from £380 to £1430 a year and the minimum grant after the increase was about £430. About 155,000 students were paid the full grant in 1980/81. Those whose parents had low income would receive the full maintenance grant.

Creation of the Student Loans Company

Student Loans in their original form were brought in under the Conservative Government of Margaret Thatcher which ended in November 1990. She was succeeded by another Conservative Prime Minister, Sir John Major. The same government was in power until May 1997.
The SLC (Student Loans Company) was founded for the 1990/91 academic year to provide students with additional help towards living costs in the form of low-interest loans. In its first year, the SLC gave loans to 180,200 students. This represented a take up rate of 28% of eligible students, with an average loan of £390.

Introduction of tuition fees
In 1997, a report by Sir Ron Dearing recommended that students should contribute to the costs of university education. The Labour government under Tony Blair passed the Teaching and Higher Education Act 1998 which introduced tuition fees of £1,000 per academic year to start in the 1998/9 academic year. In addition, maintenance grants were replaced with repayable student loans for all but the poorest students. The total loans provided by the SLC increased from £941 million in the 1997/8 academic year, to £1.23 billion in the next year, when tuition fees took effect.

Tuition fees in Scotland and Wales
In January 2000, the Scottish government, which consisted of a coalition between Labour and the Liberal Democrats, decided to replace annual tuition fees for Scottish students studying at Scottish universities with a £2,000 charge after graduation. This charge was abolished in 2008. In a similar vein, the Welsh government gives Welsh students studying at Welsh universities a tuition fee grant.

Higher Education Act 2004
The Higher Education Act 2004 increased tuition fees from £1,000 to a maximum of £3,000. By the 2005/6 academic year, the SLC was providing £2.79 billion in loans to 1,080,000 students. Those starting university in 2006 were the first to pay £3000 a year rather than £1000. The increase was brought in under the Labour Government of Tony Blair

Since 2009
In 2010 the SLC employed 1,894 people in the two Glasgow offices and at sites in Darlington and Colwyn Bay, Wales.

In late 2009, the SLC was heavily criticised by universities and students for delays in processing applications. It was further criticised in 2010, as previous issues did not seem to have been resolved. Such issues could include the repeated loss of financial evidence, refusal to acknowledge that an applicant exists, sending schedules for entirely incorrect universities and in some cases years, and failing to keep applicants informed. The Chief Executive resigned in May 2010, and the chairman, John Goodfellow, formally Chief Executive of Skipton Building Society, was required to resign, by David Willets, incoming Secretary of State for Education.

Ed Lester became chief executive in May 2010.

In 2012 an investigation by Exaro news revealed that the SLC was paying Lester through a private company enabling him to reduce his tax bill by tens of thousands of pounds. The day after the story broke the Chief Secretary of the Treasury, Danny Alexander was summoned to the House of Commons for an urgent debate. He told MPs that Ed Lester would have tax and national insurance deducted at source from that point on.

In 2014 it was announced that student loans would be made available to postgraduate students aged under 30 for the first time.

Eligibility
Students must meet two eligibility requirements: personal eligibility and course/institution eligibility. Personal eligibility principally concerns the student's residency status. To achieve course/institution eligibility, the student must be studying for an undergraduate degree at a UK degree-awarding institution or other verified higher education institution (HEI). Students on some teacher, youth and community worker courses are also eligible for SLC support. From academic year 2016/17, students aged under 60 studying for a postgraduate taught Masters at a UK degree-awarding institution or other verified HEI became eligible for a £10,000 student loan.

Tuition fee loan
All full-time students are entitled to a loan covering the full tuition fee. From the 2012/13 academic year, universities were entitled to charge up to £3,465 for pre-2012 students, and up to £9,000 for post-2012 students. Since academic year 2006/07 when variable tuition fees of up to £3000 were introduced by Tony Blair's Labour government, the maximum tuition fee had been increased each year with the April forecast for RPIX inflation for the following academic year. For academic year 2010/11 the maximum tuition fee had reached £3290 and in the 2011/12 academic year the tuition fee was raised again to £3,375. The "old system" maximum tuition fee was raised one last time for academic year 2012/13 to £3465, a level it has remained at for subsequent academic years in England. For courses starting after 1 September 2012 the maximum tuition fee cap was raised to a maximum of £9,000 per year for full-time students and £6,750 for part-time students where the HEI has an access agreement in place, and a maximum of £6,000 and £4,500 respectively where the HEI does not. Scottish and Welsh universities were also entitled to raise their tuition fees; however, Scottish-domiciled students studying in Scotland are entitled to free tuition and the Welsh Assembly pays any tuition fees for Welsh-domiciled students over and above the "old system" cap as uprated by inflation, of £3,810 for academic year 2015/16. Northern Ireland retained the existing post-2006 student loan system. Both pre-2012 and post-2012 maximum tuition fee caps were frozen at 2012/13 levels between 2012/13 and 2016/17 in England. Elsewhere the "old system" cap continued to be uprated annually with the April forecast for RPIX inflation for the following academic year, reaching £3,925 for the academic year 2016/17 and £4,030 for academic year 2017/18. Tuition fee caps remained frozen in England at £3,465 and £9,000 respectively in academic year 2016/17, but rose for post-2012 regime students in some institutions from 2017/18 with forecast RPIX to £6,165 (basic amount) and £9,250 (higher amount) in academic year 2017/18 with the introduction of the Teaching Excellence Framework.

Maintenance loan
All eligible UK-domiciled students are also entitled to a maintenance loan, which is designed to help pay for living costs whilst at university. All students are entitled to a set amount, with those living at home entitled to less and those living away from home in London entitled to more. For the 2009/2010 academic year, the maintenance loan was set at £2,763 for students living at home; £4,998 for students living in London; and £3,564 for students living at universities elsewhere in the UK.

Students from low-income households may qualify for an increased maintenance loan and/or maintenance grant (for every £1 of maintenance grant received the maintenance loan entitlement reduces by £0.50). For the 2009/2010 academic year, students living at home were entitled to an extra £1,075 (bringing the total loan to £3,838); students living in London were entitled to an extra £1,940 (bringing the total loan to £6,928); and students living elsewhere in the UK were entitled to an extra £1,386 (bringing the total loan to £4,950). The precise threshold for qualifying as a low-income household varies depending on which country of the UK the student resides in, and is set between two bands, with very poor students receiving the full extra money and less-poor students receiving only a partial extra amount.

For "old system" (pre-2012) students and "new system" (post-2012) students in academic year 2014/2015, the maximum maintenance loan rates rose by 1% for students studying both in and outside London. For post-2012 students in 2014/15, those living away from home studying outside London could access maximum loans of £5,555 (up from £5,500 for 2013/14), while those living away from home studying in London could access maximum loans of £7,751 (up from £7,675 for 2013/14).

For academic year 2015/16, maximum maintenance loan rates for both pre-2012 and post-2012 students will rise by forecast RPIX inflation (3.34%). The post-2012 maximum maintenance loan (for students living away from home, outside London) rose from £5,555 to £5,740 and the pre-2012 maximum maintenance loan (for students living away from home, outside London) will rise from £5,000 to £5,167.

For academic year 2016/17, maximum maintenance loan rates for new students increased substantially to £8,200 (for students living away from home, outside London) to correspond with the abolition of maintenance grants. Maintenance loans were increased by forecast RPIX of 2.8% to a maximum of £8,430 (for students living away from home, outside London) in academic year 2017/18.

Maintenance loans were extended to part-time students from academic year 2018/19 (including distance learners from 2019/20).

Maintenance grant
Students from low-income households are entitled to an increased loan and also a maintenance grant, which does not have to be repaid. Like the extra maintenance loan, the precise threshold for qualifying as a low-income household varies depending on which county of the UK the student resides in, and is set between two bands, with very poor students receiving the full grant and less-poor students receiving only a partial grant. For the 2009/2010 academic year, students from England and Wales were entitled to a grant of up to £2,906; students from Scotland £2,105; and students from Northern Ireland £3,406.

Maximum maintenance grants in England were frozen at 2009/10 levels in academic years 2010/11 and 2011/12. The 2012 Higher Education reforms in England brought a higher maximum maintenance grant of £3,250 in 2012/13 for "new system" students and the maximum pre-2012 maintenance grant for "old system" students was increased by inflation for the first time in 3 years from £2,906 to £2,984. Maintenance grants on both systems were uprated by forecast RPIX inflation (3.2%) in academic year 2013/14 and by 1% in academic year 2014/15. For academic year 2015/16 maintenance grants on both systems will be frozen at 2014/15 levels: the post-2012 maintenance grant being frozen at £3,387 and the pre-2012 maintenance grant being frozen at £3,110.

Maintenance grants were abolished for new students in academic year 2016/17 with maintenance grant levels being frozen at 2014/15 levels for all existing students. Maintenance grants were increased in line with forecast RPIX of 2.8% for all existing students in academic year 2017/18, meaning a maximum grant of £3,482 available for post-2012 (pre-2016) students.

Other grants
The SLC provides other grants, such as the Special Support Grant which is available for students on benefits. However, the tuition fee loan, maintenance loan and maintenance grant are by far the most common assistance that the SLC provides.

On the "old system" (pre-2012) higher education institutions themselves charging the maximum tuition fee are legally obliged to give a non-repayable bursary worth a minimum of 10% of the tuition fee to students in receipt of a full maintenance grant. On the "new system" (post-2012) no such requirement exists, however, those institutions charging more than the basic fee level of £6000 (full-time) need to include some support for disadvantaged students in their access agreements which need to be approved by OFFA.

Repayment and interest
Prior to the 1998/1999 academic year, repayment was made under a fixed-term or 'mortgage-style' system of equal monthly instalments which began when the graduate earned over a specified threshold set at 85% of average annual earnings for full-time workers (£29,219 for the 2017/2018 academic year). Any graduate with annual gross income below this deferment threshold is eligible to apply to defer their repayments for 12 months at a time. This system was criticized because no matter what the size of the loan, it had to be repaid in 60 (for up to 4 loans) or 84 (for more loans) monthly instalments. For these loans, the interest rate is set each September, equal to the RPI for the previous March. While Islam prohibits interest on debts as usury, some Muslim scholars and organisations ruled that it is permissible for Muslim students to take both tuition and maintenance loans, as they have been considered to be mudharabah (investment contract).

Mortgage-style loans will be written off if the borrower dies, or through disability becomes permanently unfit for work, or if one of the following occurs:
 The borrower reaches age 50 and the borrower was aged below 40 when they took out their last loan
 The borrower reaches age 60 and the borrower was aged 40 or over when they took out their last loan
 The 25th anniversary is reached from when the borrower took out their last loan

Loans taken out for courses that began between September 1998 and August 2012 are repaid under the so-called 'Plan 1' variant of an income-contingent repayment (ICR) scheme.
Repayments do not begin until the April after graduation or leaving a course. Thereafter, repayments are fixed at 9% of gross income above a threshold, as shown in the table below. The interest rate for these loans is the lower of either the Bank of England base rate plus 1%, varying throughout the year, or the RPI measure of inflation, set each September to the value from the previous March. On average, student with these loan accrued a total debt of £25,000.

Loans taken out for courses beginning after 1 September 2012 (which are much larger due to the increase in tuition fees) will be repaid under a new 'Plan 2' variant of the ICR scheme. Such loans did not enter repayment until at least April 2016. Under this scheme, repayments are also calculated as 9% of annual gross income, but relative to a higher initial threshold than Plan 1. The interest for these loans will initially accrue at the rate of RPI plus 3% until they become eligible for repayment (the April after graduating), after which there will be a progressive rate of interest dependent on income. The rate will range from RPI for those earning up to £21,000 per annum, up to a maximum of RPI+3% at a salary of £41,000 and above.
On average students with loans taken after September 2012 would initially accrue £44,000 of debt.. This average loan balance increased further from academic year 2016/17 with the large shift from maintenance grant to maintenance loan funding. The repayment threshold for Plan 2 loans was increased from £21,000 to £25,000 for tax year 2018/19, and annually with average earnings thereafter, despite a previous intention to freeze it at £21,000 until at least April 2021. This is a very expensive change and it is unclear whether it can be sustained into the future. At the same time, the upper interest threshold was raised to £45,000 from £41,000.

Postgraduate student loans are repaid under another plan type variant of the ICR scheme, at a rate of 6% above the repayment threshold and interest is added at a fixed rate of RPI+3% (see Postgraduate student loans below). It was originally announced at Budget 2016 that the intention was for Doctoral postgraduate loans to be repaid at 9% above the same threshold with a combined 9% repayment rate applying where a borrower is repaying both Masters and Doctoral postgraduate loans; however, this was later revised to one combined postgraduate repayment of 6%.

Outstanding income-contingent loans are written off if the borrower dies, through disability becomes permanently unfit for work, or at the following times:
 For loans taken out from September 1998 to August 2006 (England, Wales & Northern Ireland): when the borrower reaches age 65
 For loans taken out from September 1998 to August 2007 (Scotland): earlier of when the borrower reaches age 65 or 30 years after they became eligible for repayment (this was originally at age 65 only but was amended in 2018)
 For loans taken out from September 2006 to August 2012 (England and Wales): 25 years after they became eligible for repayment 
 For loans taken out from September 2006 onwards (Northern Ireland): 25 years after they became eligible for repayment
 For loans taken out from September 2007 onwards (Scotland): 30 years after they became eligible for repayment (this was originally 35 years but was amended in 2018)
 For loans taken out from September 2012 onwards (England and Wales): 30 years after they became eligible for repayment

Income-contingent loan repayments are usually made via the tax system. For employed borrowers in the PAYE system, this means the repayments can vary even from week to week. If this results in the total repayments for a tax year being more than the required annual amount, the excess may be reimbursed on request.

^ The repayment and interest thresholds are set to the tax year starting on 6 April immediately prior to the corresponding academic year.

† On 4 December 2008 the Bank of England base rate was cut to 2% pa. As the ICR Plan 1 interest rate can never be more than 1% above the Bank of England base rate, the loan interest rate was cut to 3%. The rate was cut again for the same reasons in January, February, and March 2009.

‡ The Teaching and Higher Education Act 1998 allows the government to charge—or indeed not to charge—compound interest for income-contingent loans. If interest is to be charged by virtue of regulations, the rate must not exceed that needed to maintain the value of the loans in real terms (by reference to RPI) and must not at any time exceed the rate for low-interest loans (bank base rate + 1%). The Education Act 2011 allows post-2012 student loans to accrue interest up to market rates, again by virtue of regulations. In 2009 the government opted not to charge interest when the RPI rate was below zero in order not to reduce revenue by applying a negative rate of interest. No such option applies to the pre-1998 mortgage-style loans, and the negative rate of interest was indeed applied to those loans.

†† The Teaching and Higher Education Act 1998 contains a clause in relation to loans issued for courses starting from 1 September 2012 stating that if interest is to be charged by virtue of regulations then the rate(s) must be—
(i) lower than those prevailing on the market, or
(ii) no higher than those prevailing on the market, where the other terms on which such loans are provided are more favourable to borrowers than those prevailing on the market.
The prevailing market rates were lower for a period in 2021; hence the maximum student loan interest rates for Plan 2 and Plan 3 loans were capped.

+ Amending regulations introduced in 2011 provided for the indexation of the ICR Plan 1 repayment threshold by the prior year's March RPI at the start of every tax year up to and including April 2015, to start from April 2012. Amending regulations 2014 removed the time-limit to the annual threshold adjustments to ensure that the threshold maintains its real value for the lifetime of the loans.

- A threshold freeze for 2022/23 was announced for Plan 2 and Postgraduate Loans.

§ Scottish students have been removed from plan 1 to plan 4. The terms are identical to plan 1 apart from the higher repayment threshold.

Repayment from overseas
Graduates who spend time overseas for more than three months are required to fill in an Overseas Income Assessment Form theoretically to provide the Student Loan Company with a way of fixing repayments during that time in fixed instalments over twelve months. This fixed schedule highlights another inflexibility of the overseas repayment mechanism when compared to the UK PAYE scheme. In addition a reassessment can be applied for when moving between countries with different threshold bands.

The mechanism for repaying post-2012 loans if the debtor has moved overseas is much the same as for those still in the UK: the same 9% of gross income over a specified threshold (set in pounds sterling) applies, except that the threshold is varied by country, ostensibly to take into account differences in salaries, cost of living, etc., when compared to the UK. For example, in Poland, the 2012 threshold was £7,005 for Plan 1 loans (cf. £17,495 in the UK), and between £8,400 and £16,400 for Plan 2 loans (cf. the lower and upper bounds of £21,000 and £41,000 for UK earners). The thresholds are reviewed at an unspecified time each year.

If a recipient of a loan does not return an Overseas Income Assessment Form, a default monthly repayment amount, which also varies by country, will be applied. This figure is based on twice the country's national average income and so is potentially quite large. However, the SLC's record in pursuing money from students in a foreign country is extremely poor, with 45% of such loans in 2012 in arrears of repayment or actually written off (see below).

Postgraduate student loans
It was announced at Autumn Statement 2014 (3 December 2014) that from academic year 2016/17, students aged under 30 studying for a postgraduate taught Masters at a UK degree-awarding institution or other verified HEI will be eligible for a £10,000 student loan. The proposed repayment terms and eligibility criteria were put out to consultation in March 2015 and the outcome was published at Autumn Statement 2015 (25 November 2015).

The outcome of the consultation confirmed many aspects of the initial proposals but also contained several changes. Anyone aged under 60 who meets the other eligibility criteria will be eligible for a postgraduate loan (previously it had been proposed that the loans would be restricted to under 30s), as will postgraduate research students. The repayment threshold of £21,000 has been confirmed, although the repayment rate (initially proposed to be 9%) will now be 6% of income above the threshold, ensuring repayments will be as affordable as possible for students repaying both an undergraduate and postgraduate student loan (the combined repayment rate is 15% although the repayment thresholds differ) as it is also confirmed that repayments will be concurrent between the two loans. The interest rate applied to the loans has been confirmed as fixed at RPI+3% (unlike undergraduate plan 2 loans where interest varies between RPI and RPI+3% depending on income).

As with undergraduate plan 2 loans, the postgraduate loans will be written off 30 years after they become eligible to be repaid (April after leaving course), although no postgraduate loans will be eligible for repayment before April 2019 (a change from the proposed April 2018).

It was announced at Budget 2016 that Doctoral postgraduate loans of £25,000 would be available from academic year 2018/19. It was originally announced at Budget 2016 that the intention was for Doctoral postgraduate loans to be repaid at 9% above the repayment threshold with a combined 9% repayment rate applying where a borrower is repaying both Masters and Doctoral postgraduate loans; however, this was later revised to one combined postgraduate repayment of 6%.

One key difference for part-time postgraduate students compared with undergraduate student loans is that only 30% of the postgraduate student loan is considered income according to new regulations detailed in statutory instrument 743 of 2016 an extract of which appears below.  These new laws have implications for eligibility to benefits resulting in part-time postgraduate students potentially eligible to benefits. Therefore postgraduate student loans for part-time students are unlike undergraduate student loans which usually exclude students from receipt of benefits.

Statutory Instruments S2016 No. 743, Social Security, The Social Security (Treatment of Postgraduate Master’s Degree Loans and Special Support Loans) (Amendment) Regulations 2016:

'Where a student is treated as possessing a postgraduate master’s degree loan under paragraph (3) in respect of an academic year, the amount of that loan to be taken into account as income shall be, subject to paragraph (5), a sum equal to 30 per cent. of the maximum postgraduate master’s degree loan the student is able to acquire in respect of that academic year by taking reasonable steps to do so.'

Private student loans 
Private loans are generally only sought in addition to government student loans, rather than in place of them (for example if their student loan does not cover accommodation costs). These loans are not guaranteed by a government agency and are made to students by banks or finance companies. Unlike Government loans the repayments do not vary based on future earnings, and the loan will not be written off after a certain period.

Private student loan types 
Private student loans generally come in two types: school-channel and direct-to-consumer.

School-channel loans offer borrowers lower interest rates but generally take longer to process. School-channel loans are "certified" by the school, which means the school signs off on the borrowing amount, and the funds are disbursed directly to the school.

Direct-to-consumer private loans are not certified by the school; schools don't interact with a direct-to-consumer private loan at all. The student simply supplies enrolment verification to the lender, and the loan proceeds are disbursed directly to the student. Although direct-to-consumer loans generally carry higher interest rates than school-channel loans, they do allow families to get access to funds very quickly – in some cases, in a matter of days.

Private student loan rates and fees 
Private student loans typically have variable interest rates while government student loans have fixed rates. Private loans often carry an origination fee. Origination fees are a one-time charge based on the amount of the loan. They can be taken out of the total loan amount or added on top of the total loan amount, often at the borrower's preference.  All lenders are legally required to provide you with a statement of the "APR (Annual Percentage Rate)" for the loan before you sign a promissory note and commit to it. Unlike the "base" rate, this rate includes any fees charged and can be thought of as the "effective" interest rate including actual interest, fees, etc. When comparing loans, it may be easier to compare APR rather than "rate" to ensure an apples-to-apples comparison

Most private loan programs are tied to one or more financial indices, such as the BBA LIBOR rate, plus an overhead charge. Because private loans are based on the credit history of the applicant, the overhead charge varies. Students and families with excellent credit generally receive lower rates and smaller loan origination fees than those with less than perfect credit.

Private loans in the UK are offered by the following companies:-

 HSBC - Postgraduate loans. 
 Barclays/Co-op - Professional and career and development loans.
 Future Finance - Student and Graduate loans.
 Lendwise - Postgraduate Student Loans and Professional Qualifications Student loans.

Controversy

2009 Student Loans Company problems
In the summer and autumn of 2009, many students experienced delays in being assessed for and obtaining student loans and grants. As courses began in September or October, the SLC said that up to 116,000 students would have to begin the term without their funding in place. By 10 November 2009, there were still 70,000 applications waiting to be processed and 3 out of 4 universities were using their own emergency funds to help affected students. Chair of the student group Unions 94 Michael Payne branded the situation "inexcusable" and the Million+ group of universities said the failures were "very disappointing".

An inquiry into the problems was set up, chaired by Professor Sir Deian Hopkin. The inquiry reported on 9 December 2009. It found that the SLC processing system had faced problems with lost documents, equipment failures and difficulties with the online application system, and at peak times only 5% of phone calls were answered.

Responding to the report, the leader of the UCU lecturers' union, Sally Hunt, said it had been "a total fiasco from start to finish" with failures that "beggar belief". Liberal Democrat university spokesman Stephen Williams branded the report "truly damning, revealing a breathtaking level of incompetence within the Student Loans Company."

As a result of the report, the heads of customer services and information and communication technology at the SLC resigned, and the senior management team was restructured. However, the board of the SLC warned it could be another two years before the service was running properly.

The SLC was also forced to delay accepting applications for the 2010/11 academic year.

2011 chief executive tax avoidance issue 

In January 2012, a BBC Newsnight and Exaro investigation revealed that Ed Lester, the head of the SLC, was being paid his salary via a private firm, allowing him to reduce his payment of income tax and national insurance contributions. It was subsequently announced that he would be treated as a regular employee in the future. In May 2012, Lester announced he would be leaving the SLC at the expiration of his contract in January 2013 although he insisted that the controversy had no bearing on his decision. His replacement is Mick Laverty, a former regional development agency chief executive, appointed in October 2012 and incumbent from January 2013.

Overpayment and non-repayment problems and the 2019 More Frequent Data Sharing

Major problems continue to beset the repayments system, leading to many thousands of graduates overpaying on their loans. The issue is that although repayments are processed by the SLC, under a specialist department headed by Kevin O'Connor, they are actually collected by HMRC. The payments collected by HMRC are passed across annually, and only then is the amount left on the student loan calculated. If the SLC notice an overpayment, then the money should be returned with interest. However, long delays in this process have been noticed - and in addition, the SLC have on occasion neglected to inform HMRC to stop taking payments, so a further year of repayments even when the loan has been acknowledged as cleared is not unusual. In 2011/12, the money wrongly taken because of these practices amounted to £36.5 million. In 2009, a new direct debit system was introduced to try and address this problem for graduates who were estimated to have fewer than two years' repayments left to make. However, poor administration has bedevilled this system from the start, and inadequate record-keeping means the SLC have great difficulty identifying how much is owed by individuals, meaning that occasionally they either miss the time when repayments should be switched to the direct debit system, or worse, send demand notices to graduates who have already paid off their loan.

The transfer of information and even money between HMRC and the SLC has also been beset with difficulties, again apparently due to poor record keeping and the decision to process all repayments at once. Some graduates have found that large sums of money have gone missing in the records. The SLC will alter their records on receipt of the relevant payslips and P60s showing the missing payments. However, that makes it necessary to check all paperwork carefully and retain records for the period in question. Graduates are advised by Student Finance England to check all paperwork and ensure that the repayments are going in according to schedule, and not be afraid to complain or otherwise draw the SLC's attention to the matter should they make a mistake.

In 2019, HMRC and SLC developed a new process to increase the frequency of which information was shared to SLC that contained the customer repayments, through weekly reports to SLC that arrived on Mondays, and the files would be posted overnight onto accounts and made available the following morning once those repayments were posted to the customer's balance, thoughout the week. These reports however are sourced from the businesses payroll of where the customers work which are sometimes beset with issues where employers were not filing repayments correctly with SLC, removing previous repayments and then providing the missing amount them into each consecutive payroll run. Also issues where Employers were reporting pay twice to SLC and sometimes outright not filing student loan repayments correctly preventing SLC from receiving the information necessary to update the customer's balance. This however has greatly improved the services SLC provides with a more up to date balance but customers should always consider having payslips available to ensure SLC is fully up to date. However this does not solve the problem where Employers did not report to HMRC the customer's income for previous years which in some cases required SLC and the customer to work with HMRC to locate and allocate the repayments made by the Employer as SLC is limited to and can only work from the information it is provided as they don't have any involvement with the payroll process. This process was introduced also to accommodate for the Post Graduate (Plan 3) loans which were repaid and allocated separately with no interaction to the undergraduate loans.

Non-collection of money due also causes problems.  Because loans are collected through the UK tax system, there is no efficacious system of collecting them from eligible non-UK students who have returned to their home country (mostly in the EU) and the SLC has never attempted to sue through a foreign court for the money they are owed.  In January 2012, more than 45% of such loans were in arrears and apparently had been effectively written off, at a cost to the Treasury of over £20 million. In December 2013, the Public Accounts Committee described the repayments system as 'blatantly inadequate' and its chairman Margaret Hodge advised the Chief Executive that when it came to systems for ensuring repayment, 'These are very simple things you are not doing.'

See also
 Contractual term
 Erudio Student Loans
 Sidney Perry Foundation student grants
 Limitation Act 1980
 Tuition fees in the UK
 Universities in the UK

References

External links
Directgov student finance section
Student Loans company website

Department for Business, Innovation and Skills
Education finance in the United Kingdom
United Kingdom
Loans
United Kingdom